The molecular formula C17H18O5, molar mass: 302.32 g/mol, exact mass: 302.115423686 u, may refer to:

 Diffutidin, a flavan
 Isonotholaenic acid, a dihydrostilbenoid
 Notholaenic acid
 Proxicromil, an antihistamine

Molecular formulas